Rachal is a surname. Notable people with the surname include:

Chilo Rachal (born 1986), American football player
Latario Rachal (born 1974), American football player

See also
 Rachals (surname)
 Rachal (disambiguation)
 Rachel (given name)